Monica Seles successfully defended her title, defeating Gabriela Sabatini 6–3, 7–5 in the final.

Seeds
All seeds received a bye into the second round.

  Steffi Graf (semifinals)
  Monica Seles (champion)
  Gabriela Sabatini (final)
  Mary Joe Fernández (semifinals)
  Zina Garrison-Jackson (quarterfinals)
  Jennifer Capriati (quarterfinals)
  Manuela Maleeva-Fragniere (quarterfinals)
  Natasha Zvereva (second round)
  Barbara Paulus (fourth round)
  Nathalie Tauziat (fourth round)
  Helen Kelesi (second round)
  Amy Frazier (third round)
  Laura Gildemeister (third round)
  Rosalyn Fairbank-Nideffer (second round)
  Naoko Sawamatsu (third round)
  Raffaella Reggi (fourth round)
 Lori McNeil (third round)
 Manon Bollegraf (second round)
 Catarina Lindqvist (second round)
 Susan Sloane (second round)
 Gretchen Magers (third round)
 Regina Rajchrtová (fourth round)
 Meredith McGrath (third round)
 Carrie Cunningham (second round)
 Julie Halard (second round)
 Ann Grossman (third round)
 Marianne Werdel (fourth round)
 Cathy Caverzasio (second round)
 Wiltrud Probst (second round)
 Eva Švíglerová (third round)
 Stephanie Rehe (second round)
 Elizabeth Smylie (third round)

Draw

Finals

Top half

Section 1

Section 2

Section 3

Section 4

Bottom half

Section 5

Section 6

Section 7

Section 8

Qualifying

Seeds

  Camille Benjamin (Promoted to Main Draw)
  Renata Baranski (second round)
  Bettina Fulco (second round)
  Nathalie Guerrée (first round)
  Clare Wood (qualified)
  Eva Pfaff (second round)
  Maïder Laval (qualifying competition)
  Michelle Jaggard (second round)
  Sandra Wasserman (qualified)
  Hu Na (first round)
  Cláudia Chabalgoity (second round)
  Claudine Toleafoa (qualified)
  Noëlle van Lottum (first round)
  Pascale Etchemendy (first round)
  Andrea Vieira (first round)
  Julie Richardson (qualifying competition)

Qualifiers

 Rene Simpson-Alter
 Stacey Schefflin
 Nathalie Housset
 Claudine Toleafoa
 Clare Wood
 Yael Segal
 Miriam Oremans
 Petra Thorén

Draw

First qualifier

Second qualifier

Third qualifier

Fourth qualifier

Fifth qualifier

Sixth qualifier

Seventh qualifier

Eighth qualifier

References
 Main and Qualifying Draws
 Official results archive (WTA)

Women's Singles